Joseph Quigley (22 November 1899 – 25 March 1974) was an Irish Fine Gael politician. He was a member of Seanad Éireann from 1961 to 1965. He was elected to the 10th Seanad in 1961 by the Industrial and Commercial Panel. He lost his seat at the 1965 Seanad election.

References

1899 births
1974 deaths
Fine Gael senators
Irish farmers
Members of the 10th Seanad